Pakość  is a town in Inowrocław County, Kuyavian-Pomeranian Voivodeship, Poland, with 5,798 inhabitants (2004).
Town Privileges were given to Pakość on 9 February 1359. The town today counts 5,798 inhabitants (2004). It is located within the historic region of Kuyavia.

The town is the main hub of trade and services in the neighbourhood area. Small industry is based here and the town is an important communication and transportation hub.

Pakość is an important centre of worship of the Catholic Church because of the famous calvary – the complex of chapels resembling Jerusalem and commemorating the Passion of Christ.

History

The oldest known mention of Pakość comes from 1243. In 1258 a castle was erected. Town privileges were given to Pakość on 9 February 1359. It was a private town, owned by Polish nobility, administratively located in the Inowrocław Voivodeship in the Greater Poland Province of the Polish Crown. In the 15th and 16th centuries it was a Protestant center. The Działyński noble family founded a Baroque Catholic monastery, which remains one of the landmarks of the town.

Pakość was annexed by Prussia in the First Partition of Poland in 1772. In 1807 it became part of the short-lived Polish Duchy of Warsaw, in 1815 it was re-annexed by Prussia, and in 1871 it became part of Germany. The populace took part in the Greater Poland uprising (1918–19), and Pakość was successfully reintegrated with Poland, after the country regained independence in November 1918.

Gallery

Sport 
 Notecianka Pakość – football club

References

Cities and towns in Kuyavian-Pomeranian Voivodeship
Inowrocław County
Poznań Voivodeship (1921–1939)